Chhota is the Hindi word for "small" or "little" and may refer to:

Chhota Chhindwara, a town in Narsinghpur district in the state of Madhya Pradesh, India
Chhota Gobindpur, a census town in Purbi Singhbhum district in the state of Jharkhand, India
Chhota haazri, a meal served in households and barracks, particularly in northern British India, shortly after dawn
Chhota Imambara, an imposing monument in the city of Lucknow, Uttar Pradesh, India
Chhota Saula, a village in Pirojpur District in the Barisal Division of southwestern Bangladesh
Chhota Shakeel (born 1955 or 1960), Indian man accused of association with Dawood Ibrahim
Chhota Udaipur, a city and a municipality in Vadodara district in the state of Gujarat, India
Chhota Udaipur (Lok Sabha constituency), a Lok Sabha parliamentary constituency in Gujarat